Lemodinae is a beetle subfamily in the family Anthicidae.

References

External links

 Lemodinae by Dmitry Telnov

Tenebrionoidea
Beetle subfamilies